The cruciform eminence (or cruciate eminence) divides the deeply concave internal surface of the occipital bone into four fossae:
 The upper two fossae are called the cerebral fossae, are triangular and lodge the occipital lobes of the cerebrum.
 The lower two are called the cerebellar fossae, are quadrilateral and accommodate the hemispheres of the cerebellum.

The upper fossae are separated from the lower fossae by a groove for the transverse sinuses. At the point of intersection between all four fossae is the internal occipital protuberance.

Additional images

References

External links

Bones of the head and neck